Shades of Black: The Conrad Black Story is a 2006 drama about ambition, love, betrayal and greed. The film chronicles the private and public struggles of Lord Conrad Black, one of the world's most controversial press barons.

Cast
 Albert Schultz  as Conrad Black
 Lara Flynn Boyle  as Barbara Amiel
 Jason Priestley  as Jeff Riley
 Jason Schombing  as David Radler
 Cedric Smith  as George
 Sharry Flett  as Betty
 Michael Seater  as Young Conrad Black
 Jeremy Akerman  as Bud
 Rick Roberts  as Morde
 Shawn Lawrence		
 Amy Price-Francis  as Shirley Black
 Corinne Conley  as Maude
 Joan Gregson  as Doris Phillips
 Philip Craig  as Meighen
 Rhea Akler  as Rona
 Ian White  as Lord
 Mark Caven  as Lawson
 Sven Van de Ven  as Henry Kissinger
 Elizabeth Shepherd  as Margaret Thatcher
 James Kall as Steward

2007 Gemini Awards
 Rene Ohashi won Best Photography in a Dramatic Program or Series
  Mike Woroniuk, Christian T. Cooke, Robert Fletcher, Paul Germann, & Barry Gilmore won Best Sound in a Dramatic Program

External links
 https://web.archive.org/web/20090305093216/http://www.screendoor.org/productions/drama/shadesofblack
 

2006 in Canadian television
Canadian biographical drama films
2006 biographical drama films
2006 films
Canadian drama television films
2006 drama films
English-language Canadian films
2000s Canadian films